Hish Subdistrict  is a Syrian nahiyah (Subdistrict) located in Ma'arrat al-Nu'man District in Idlib.  According to the Syria Central Bureau of Statistics (CBS), Hish Subdistrict had a population of 41231 in the 2004 census.

References 

Subdistricts of Idlib Governorate